Nicole Denise Cucco (born 25 August 2000), known professionally as Nicki Nicole, is an Argentine rapper and singer. Born and raised in Rosario, Santa Fe, she gained popularity with her singles "Wapo Traketero", "Colocao", "Mamichula", and "Mala Vida".

Early life 
Nicole was born in Rosario to a middle class family. She showed interest in music at a very early age. She attended Colegio Comunidad Educativa La Paz, where she completed her formal education.

Career 
In April 2019, Nicki Nicole released "Wapo Traketero" under Gonzalo Ferreyra's production. In August, the singer collaborated with Argentine producer Bizarrap on the thirteenth release of his "Music Sessions". The song peaked at number three on the Billboard Argentina Hot 100, skyrocketing both artists' popularity in the country. Later that month, Nicki Nicole released her second single, titled "Años Luz".

On 8 November 2019, Nicki Nicole released her debut album Recuerdos, which counted with production from Bizarrap and collaborations with Cazzu and Duki. The album was followed by the release of a music video for her single "Diva".

In May 2020, the singer released her single "Colocao", which peaked at number six on the Argentina Hot 100 and 48th in Spain. In August, Nicki Nicole became the first Argentine woman to top the Argentina Hot 100 chart with "Mamichula", alongside Argentine rapper Trueno and Bizarrap. The song also peaked at number one in Spain and is certified platinum in the country as well.

Her appearance in The Tonight Show Starring Jimmy Fallon in April 2021 with Lunay received a lot of press coverage in Argentina, as she was the first Argentinean artist to perform in the show.

On 28 October 2021, she presented her latest album "Parte de Mí", where tracks from early in her career were joined by new songs. Featured in this album are several artists admired by her, such as Rauw Alejandro, Delaossa, Dread Mar-I and Trueno.

On 12 November 2021, Nicki Nicole collaborated with Los Ángeles Azules to release the instant cumbia hit "Otra Noche" 

On 3 December 2021, Cucco collaborated with Aitana for a latin pop song, Formentera.

On 5 January 2022, Nicole collaborated with Tiago PZK, Lit Killah, María Becerra/ song name Entre Nosotros Remix.

On 15 December 2022, Nicole collaborated with Cris MJ, Standly and Duki/ song name Marisola Remix.

Discography 

 Recuerdos (2019)
 Parte de Mí (2021)

Awards and nominations

References 

2000 births
Living people
Latin trap musicians
Argentine trap musicians
Argentine women rappers
21st-century Argentine women singers
Musicians from Rosario, Santa Fe
Women in Latin music
Sony Music Latin artists
Latin music songwriters